Senator Fisher may refer to:

Charles Thompson Fisher (1846–1930), Wisconsin State Senate
Charles Fisher (congressman) (1789–1849), North Carolina State Senate
D. Michael Fisher (born 1944), Pennsylvania State Senate
Fred R. Fisher (1871–1959) Wisconsin State Senate
Hendrick V. Fisher (1846–1909), Illinois State Senate
Horatio Gates Fisher (1838–1890), Pennsylvania State Senate
Hubert Fisher (1877–1941), Tennessee State Senate
James Fisher (Wisconsin politician) (1816–1901), Wisconsin State Senate
John Stuchell Fisher (1867–1940), Pennsylvania State Senate
Joseph Fisher (Northern Ireland politician) (1901/1902–1963), Northern Irish Senate
Joseph W. Fisher (1814–1900), Pennsylvania State Senate
Lee Fisher (born 1951), Ohio State Senate